Trade Union Research Bureau (TURB) was an independent labour research organization in Canada. In 1937, a branch of the San Francisco-based Pacific Coast Labor Bureau was established in Vancouver. Eight years later in 1945, the TURB was established as an independent entity by founding director Bert Marcuse, Emil Bjarnason, and Eric Bee. It provided research for most trade unions located in British Columbia before closing on December 31, 2012. Its archives are held at Simon Fraser University.

References

Non-profit organizations based in Vancouver
1945 establishments in British Columbia
2012 disestablishments in British Columbia
Labour relations in British Columbia